Parnassius acdestis is a high-altitude butterfly found in India. It is a member of the genus Parnassius of the swallowtail family, Papilionidae. The species was first described by Grigory Grum-Grshimailo in 1891.

Description
Note: The wing pattern in Parnassius species is inconsistent and the very many subspecies and forms make identification problematic and uncertain. Structural characters derived from the genitalia, wing venation, sphragis and foretibial epiphysis are more, but not entirely reliable. The description given here is a guide only. For an identification key see P.R. Ackery (1975).

Hindwing with very narrow marginal band, the submarginal spots isolated, small; the ultracellular costal spot of forewing continued by grey scaling, forming an s-shaped band.

Subspecies 
 Parnassius acdestis cerevisiae Weiss & Michel
 Parnassius acdestis cinerosus Stichel
 Parnassius acdestis felix Eisner
 Parnassius acdestis hades (Bryk)
 Parnassius acdestis imperatoides Weiss & Michel
 Parnassius acdestis irenaephis Bryk
 Parnassius acdestis ladakensis Avinoff, 1916
 Parnassius acdestis lathonius Bryk
 Parnassius acdestis limitis Weiss & Michel
 Parnassius acdestis macdonardi Rothschild
 Parnassius acdestis manco Koiwaya
 Parnassius acdestis ohkuma Koiwaya
 Parnassius acdestis peeblesi Bryk
 Parnassius acdestis peshkei Eisner, 1933
 Parnassius acdestis rupshuana Avinoff, 1916
 Parnassius acdestis takedai Mikami & Sakakibara, 1988
 Parnassius acdestis vogti (Bang-Haas)
 Parnassius acdestis yanae Huang, 1998

Range
Kirghistan, Nepal, northern India (Jammu & Kashmir, Sikkim), western China, Sinkiang and Szechwan.

Status
Very local. Rather rare. Not known to be threatened.

See also
Papilionidae
List of butterflies of India
List of butterflies of India (Papilionidae)

References

 
 
 
 Sakai S., Inaoka S., Toshiaki A., Yamaguchi S., Watanabe Y., (2002) The Parnassiology. The Parnassius Butterflies, A Study in Evolution, Kodansha, Japan. 
 Weiss Jean-Claude, (1999) Parnassiinae of the World, Hillside Books, Canterbury, UK. ,

Further reading
sv:Parnassius acdestis - Swedish Wikipedia provides further references and synonymy

External links
 NRM Holotype of Parnassius acdestis peeblesi Bryk, 1932.

acdestis
Fauna of Pakistan
Butterflies described in 1891